Encounter: The Killing is a 2002 Indian Bollywood film produced and directed by Ajay Phansekar. It stars Naseeruddin Shah, Dilip Prabhavalkar and Tara Deshpande in pivotal roles.

Plot

The film revolves around a Police Inspector (Naseeruddin Shah), who is out to find the parents of a boy, Lallya (Rahul Mehendale) whom he had killed in a police encounter. The movie shows the hypocrisy of the middle class wherein their kids are involved in crimes due to lack of parental attention and yet the indifferent parents live in a different world, oblivious of the reality.

Cast
 Naseeruddin Shah... Inspector Sam Bharucha
 Dilip Prabhavalkar... Ponappa Awadhe
 Tara Deshpande... Kiran Jaywant
 Ratna Pathak Shah... Mrs. Sudhakar Rao
 Akash Khurana... Sudhakar Rao
 Deepak Shirke... Tatya
 Avtar Gill... D.C.P.
 Sanjeev Dabholkar... Inspector Avinash Marathe
 Rahul Mehendale... Lalya aka Sunil Rao, Sudhakar's son
 Sachin Kshirsagar... Sonya aka Sonal Deshpande
 Sushant Shelar... Martin
 Mahesh Jadhav... Nana aka Anand Satpal
 Rajan Bane as Inspector Kharat
 Rajendra Mehra as Kiran's father
 Jaywant Wadkar as Jadya
 Roshan Tirandaz as Shirin Bharucha, Sam's wife
 Brijesh Tripathi as Police Commissioner
 Sharad Vyas as Bhiku Seth
 Suman Mastakar as Freedom Fighter Deshpande
 Milind Vaidya as Inspector Yadav 
 Vinay Patkar as Inspector Shinde
 Firdous Mevawala as Justice Pokhranwala
 Satish Salagare as Maath, Matter's younger brother
 Kailash Churi as Matter
 Vimal Mhatre as Matter's mother
 Sachin Shinde as Kanya, Matter's youngest brother
 Shivaji Shinde as Ramanna, Jalsa Bar & Restaurant owner
 Nagesh Morvekar as Sadappa, Jalsa Bar & Restaurant manager
 Purva Deshpande as Sujata Rao, Sudhakar's daughter
 Rajshree Nikam as Nana's sister
 Medha Gokhale as Martin's mother
 Smita Oak as Kiran's mother
 Tara Malwankar as Sonal's mother
 Vijay Shinde as Gunda
 Sachin Thakur as Joseph, Martin's brother
 Rajan Patil as Bar owner
 Raju Kadam as Bhakkam
 Atma Bansode as Samaj Sewak
 Ravindra Diwekar as Nana's father
 Ravindra Bijur as music teacher
 Dinesh Kanade as Pangya

References

External links

2000s Hindi-language films
2002 films